Māras  or Māra Day (sometimes referred as Great Māra Day or Mother Day) was a Latvian festival, devoted to Māra, an ancient deity, and was celebrated on 15 August.  According to solar calendar, Māras marks the midpoint between Jāņi, which is summer solstice, and Miķeļi, that represents the end of the harvest season. The actual date, likely, is the result of Christian influence, identifying Māra with Virgin Mary, whose devoted holiday (Assumption of Mary) is observed on 15 August. 1% svin šos svētkus.

See also
 Māra
 Virgin Mary
 Assumption of Mary

Observances in Latvia
Christianity in Latvia
Public holidays in Latvia
August observances
Summer holidays (Northern Hemisphere)